Stefania Belmondo (born 13 January 1969) is an Italian former cross-country skier, a two-time Olympic champion and four-time world champion in her career.

Biography

Debut
Belmondo was born in Vinadio, in the province of Cuneo (Piedmont), the daughter of a housewife and an electric company employee. In her career she skied with the G.S. Forestale.

She started to ski at the age of three in the Piedmontese mountains of her native city. She made her debut at the FIS Nordic World Ski Championships in 1987. The next season she joined the main national team of Italy, and then participated at the 1988 Winter Olympics, held in Calgary, Alberta, Canada. In 1989, she won a World Cup event for her first time, in Salt Lake City, and ended that season second overall.

Early success, injury, return
At the 1991 FIS Nordic World Ski Championships, she won a bronze medal in the 15 km trial, and a silver in the 4 × 5 km relay. The 1992 Winter Olympics in Albertville brought the first gold medal for Belmondo, in the 30 km specialty. At the 1993 FIS Nordic World Ski Championships, she won golds in the 5 km + 10 km combined pursuit and the 30 km, and a silver in the 4 × 5 km relay, before an injury to her right hallux required a surgery, and caused a 4-month absence from competition.

After a second operation, Belmondo participated to the 1994 Winter Olympics in Lillehammer, gaining just two bronze medals; after this disappointing performance she decided to continue skiing, against the advice of her physician. The 1996–97 season was one of her best since the surgeries, when she won three silver medals (5 km, 15 km, 30 km), all were behind Russian Yelena Välbe though she tied with Välbe in the 5 km + 10 km combined pursuit event. In the 1998 Winter Olympics in Nagano, Japan, she won a third place with the 4 × 5 km relay,  and an individual silver in the 30 km. The bronze medal in the relay was remarkable because the Italian team was ninth as Belmondo started the last leg. The 1999 FIS Nordic World Ski Championships saw Stefania Belmondo win two gold medals (5 km + 10 km combined pursuit, 15 km) and a silver (4 × 5 km relay).

In her final year of competition, 2002, she won a gold medal, as well as a silver and a bronze, in the Winter Olympics. She concluded that year's World Cup in third place.

Other career successes
Belmondo also found success at the Holmenkollen ski festival, winning the 30 km women's event twice (1997, 2002).
She is the one of only two women to ever win the 30 km Olympic, World Championship, and Holmenkollen events (Norway's Marit Bjørgen is the other).
Belmondo earned the Holmenkollen medal in 1997 (shared with Bjarte Engen Vik and Bjørn Dæhlie).

1997 World Championships
In the  pursuit event at the 1997 World Championships in Trondheim the organizers had to resort to Photo finish to determine who between Belmondo and Yelena Välbe had won the race. Eventually the gold medal is awarded to the Russian and the Italian Silver for just ,
 both athletes are still credited the same time.

2006 Winter Olympics
At the 2006 Winter Olympics in Turin, in her native region of Piedmont, she lit the Olympic Flame at the opening ceremony. During the 2006 Winter Olympics, Belmondo had a series of webpages on the 2006 Turin Winter Olympic Games website regarding her reaction and emotions during the games.

Cross-country skiing results
All results are sourced from the International Ski Federation (FIS).

Olympic Games
 10 medals – (2 gold, 3 silver, 5 bronze)

World Championships
 13 medals – (4 gold, 7 silver, 2 bronze)

a.  Cancelled due to extremely cold weather.

World Cup

Season titles
 1 title – (1 sprint)

Season standings

Individual podiums
23 victories 
66 podiums

Team podiums

 4 victories – (22 , 5 ) 
 27 podiums – (24 , 4 )

Note:  Until the 1999 World Championships and the 1994 Olympics, World Championship and Olympic races were included in the World Cup scoring system.

See also
List of multiple Winter Olympic medalists
Italian sportswomen multiple medalists at Olympics and World Championships

References

External links
 
 
 Holmenkollen medalists – click Holmenkollmedaljen for downloadable pdf file 
 Holmenkollen winners since 1892 – click Vinnere for downloadable pdf file

1969 births
Living people
Sportspeople from the Province of Cuneo
Cross-country skiers at the 1988 Winter Olympics
Cross-country skiers at the 1992 Winter Olympics
Cross-country skiers at the 1994 Winter Olympics
Cross-country skiers at the 1998 Winter Olympics
Cross-country skiers at the 2002 Winter Olympics
Holmenkollen medalists
Holmenkollen Ski Festival winners
Olympic cauldron lighters
Italian female cross-country skiers
Olympic cross-country skiers of Italy
Olympic gold medalists for Italy
Olympic silver medalists for Italy
Olympic bronze medalists for Italy
Olympic medalists in cross-country skiing
Cross-country skiers of Gruppo Sportivo Forestale
FIS Nordic World Ski Championships medalists in cross-country skiing
Medalists at the 2002 Winter Olympics
Medalists at the 1998 Winter Olympics
Medalists at the 1994 Winter Olympics
Medalists at the 1992 Winter Olympics